The Competition Act 1998 is the current major source of competition law in the United Kingdom, along with the Enterprise Act 2002. The act provides an updated framework for identifying and dealing with restrictive business practices and abuse of a dominant market position.

One of the main purposes of this act was to harmonise the UK with EU competition policy, with Chapter I and II of the act mirroring the content of Articles 81 and 82 of the Treaty of Amsterdam (formally Articles 85 and 86 of the Treaty of Rome).

Chapter I Prohibitions 

Deals with restrictive practices engaged by companies operating within the UK that distort, restrict or prevent competition. These are primarily in the form of horizontal agreements (agreements to collude between firms on the same level of the supply chain such as retailers or wholesalers). These agreements could be to limit output, collusively share information, fix prices, tender collectively and share markets out.

Competition and Markets Authority (CMA) is responsible for prosecuting such firms who engage in these activities, and are able to levy fines up to 10% of annual global turnover for every year in which a violation has taken place up to a maximum of 3 years.

Exemptions from prohibition are available if the firm can demonstrate that these practices are in the interest of the consumer through increasing market efficiencies or advancing technical progress.

Chapter II Prohibitions 

Chapter II deals with the abuse of a dominant position by a firm who uses practices such as
predatory pricing, excessive prices, refusal to supply, vertical restraints and price discrimination to maximise profit, gain competitive advantage or otherwise restrict competition.
 
In investigating alleged breaches of chapter II a two-stage process is involved. Firstly it must be identified if the firm actually possesses a dominant market position. This can be done through various concentration indices such as the Herfindahl-Hirchman Index (HHI). Generally if a firm is found to have a market share in excess of 40% then it is considered a threat to competition.

There are no exemptions to chapter II as by its very definition as "abuse" of a market position, one must be guilty of wrongdoing for the chapter to apply.

An example of the effects of the act is that in 2004, public schools were investigated for fee-fixing by the Office of Fair Trading, and in 2005 fifty of the leading schools (including Ampleforth, Eton, Charterhouse, Gresham's, Harrow, Haileybury, Marlborough, Rugby, Sevenoaks, Shrewsbury, Stowe, Wellington and Winchester) were ordered to raise £3 million between them to be spent on charities nominated by the pupils of the schools involved in the years 2001–2003, and were banned from further sharing of information on their  external fees.

References

External links

United Kingdom Acts of Parliament 1998
United Kingdom competition law